Angelika Sarna (born 1 October 1997) is a Polish athlete. She competed in the women's 800 metres event at the 2020 Summer Olympics.

References

External links
 

1997 births
Living people
Polish female middle-distance runners
Athletes (track and field) at the 2020 Summer Olympics
Olympic athletes of Poland
Place of birth missing (living people)